USS Xarifa (SP-581) was a patrol boat in the United States Navy.

Career 
Xarifa was a wooden-hulled, seagoing sailing yacht equipped with an auxiliary steam engine—was built in 1896 at Cowes, Isle of Wight, England, by John S. White & Co., Ltd. Apparently completed as Xarifa, she served for a time as Ophelie before she was purchased by C. N. Nelson in, or sometime before, 1911. She then resumed the name Xarifa and operated out of Port Washington, Long Island, N.Y.

After the outbreak of World War I, the Navy acquired the yacht on 9 August 1917 for service in European waters and designated her SP-581. However, while the ship was being fitted out, she was found to be unsuitable for "distant service" and was prepared for duty on section patrol.

Assigned to the 3rd Naval District, Xarifa was commissioned at the New York Navy Yard on 23 February 1918 and patrolled the approaches to New York harbor through the armistice. She was decommissioned on 31 March 1919 and returned to her owner on 4 May 1919.

References 
 

Patrol vessels of the United States Navy
1896 ships
World War I patrol vessels of the United States
Ships built on the Isle of Wight
Steam yachts